Pablo Jesús Rodríguez Méndez (born 7 June 1975 in Viveiro, Lugo, Galicia) is a Spanish former footballer who played as a midfielder.

External links

Biography at Historia Racinguista 

1975 births
Living people
People from A Mariña Occidental
Sportspeople from the Province of Lugo
Spanish footballers
Footballers from Galicia (Spain)
Association football midfielders
Segunda División players
Segunda División B players
Tercera División players
Deportivo Fabril players
CD Lugo players
Racing de Ferrol footballers
Girona FC players
CD Leganés players
CD Atlético Baleares footballers
SD Compostela footballers